Nassian is a town in northeastern Ivory Coast. It is a sub-prefecture of and the seat of Nassian Department in Bounkani Region, Zanzan District. Nassian is also a commune.

Notes

Sub-prefectures of Bounkani
Communes of Bounkani